Goose Creek is a stream in Preble County, Ohio, in the United States. It is a 5.1 mile-long tributary of Bantas Fork.

Goose Creek was named from the fact a family of settlers allowed their geese to roam its banks.

Location
Mouth: Northeast of Eaton, Ohio at 
Source: North of Eaton, Ohio at

See also
List of rivers of Ohio

References

Rivers of Preble County, Ohio
Rivers of Ohio